Labeo rosae, the rednose labeo, is a species of fish in the genus Labeo which is found in the Limpopo River, Incomati River and Pongolo basins in southern Africa.

References 

Labeo
Fish described in 1894